Karanj or Karenj may refer to:
 Karanj, Kohgiluyeh and Boyer-Ahmad, Iran
 Karanj, Dezful, Khuzestan Province, Iran
 Karanj, Izeh, Khuzestan Province, Iran
 Karanj (Vidhan Sabha constituency), Gujarat, India
 Karanj, Millettia pinnata, a species of tree in the pea family, Fabaceae, native to Asia
INS Karanj (S21), a diesel-electric submarine of the Indian Navy